Northwest Mountain is a massive mountain just northeast of Beehive Mountain, on the north side of upper Taylor Glacier in Victoria Land. The name appears on the maps of the British Antarctic Expedition, 1910–13.

Mountains of Victoria Land
McMurdo Dry Valleys